Legio XI Claudia ("Claudius' Eleventh Legion") was a legion of the Imperial Roman army. The legion was levied by Julius Caesar for his campaign against the Nervii. XI Claudia dates back to the two legions (the other was the XIIth) recruited by Julius Caesar to invade Gallia in 58 BC, and it existed at least until the early 5th century, guarding lower Danube in Durostorum (modern Silistra, Bulgaria).

History

Founding and Service in the Late Republic
Legio XI Claudia, along with Legio XII Fulminata, was a Roman Legion levied by Julius Caesar in 58 BC in Cisalpine Gaul, for his war against the Nervii. They likely were present at the Siege of Alesia. After his campaigns in Gaul, civil war broke out between Julius Caesar and Pompey, both of whom were triumvirs, and in January, 49 BC, Caesar invaded Italy with Legio XI serving in his army. They fought in 48 BC at Dyrrhachium and Pharsalus, but were disbanded in 45 BC and settled in Central Italy around the area of Bovianum Undecumanorum.

Legio XI was reconstituted in 42 BC by Octavian for the civil wars. They served under the command of the second triumvirate consisting of Augustus, Mark Antony, and Marcus Aemilius Lepidus against Brutus and Cassius, who had assassinated Julius Caesar. The Legion was present at the Battle of Phillipi in 42 BC, following which they were dispatched to Perugia in Italy to suppress a local revolt. They likely also served with Octavian in Sicily against Sextus Pompeius.

Legio XI participated in the civil war between Augustus and Mark Antony from 32 to 32 BC, and ended with the Battle of Actium. Their participation in the battle was commemorated on the tombstones of soldiers from the Legion.

Principate
Afterwards, the XI was sent to the Balkans, where it seems to have stayed for a century or so. The location of its base is uncertain prior to 9 AD, when it is recorded at Burnum (Kistanje) on the coast with Legio VII Claudia, mostly involved in construction and development works such as roads. Vexillationes were stationed at Salona and Gardun as well. In 42 AD, Legio XI was still stationed at Burnum when the governor of Dalmatia, Scribonianus, revolted against Claudius. In response, Legio XI put down the rebellion and was awarded the title Claudia Pia Fidelis. Legio XI Claudia remained at Burnum until around 68 AD, at the time of the death of Nero.

During the Year of the Four Emperors, Legio XI Claudia, alongside Legio VII Claudia and Legio XIIII Gemina, sided with Otho, who had executed Galba against Vitellius. They marched to the Battle of Bedriacum but arrived too late, and Vitellius ordered Legio XI Claudia to return to the Balkans without any punishment. Legio XI then sided with Vespasian and participated in the Second Battle of Bedriacum, which resulted in a victory for Vespasian and his accession as emperor.

In 70 AD, Legio XI was part of the expeditionary force under Cerialis to put down the Batavian Revolt on the Rhine. They were then stationed at Vindonissa (Windisch) in 71 AD. There are reports of Legio XI fighting in on the Rhine in 73–74 AD and they participated in Domitian's war against the Chatti in 83 AD. It is believed to have been stationed in Mainz at the time. Later in 101, it was sent to Brigetio (Szony) in Pannonia. They participated in Trajan's Dacian Wars from 101 to 106 AD, commemorated with a column in Rome.

Legio XI Claudia was then sent to Durostorum (Silistra) before 114 AD, when they are first attested at the site, and would remain headquartered there for at least the next three centuries. Soldiers of Legio XI Claudia were dispatched to occupy the Crimea, build the fortress at Drajna in Prahova, and to serve bureaucratic functions in Tomis. A vexillatio was sent to Judea in 132 under Hadrian to suppress the Bar Kokhba revolt; an inscription bearing the legion's name was found near Betar. In 193, Legio XI Claudia supported Septimus Severus and they fought against Pescennius Niger, besieging Byzantium, forcing their way through the Cilician gates, and fighting against his forces at the Battle of Issus. They also took part in Severus' Parthian campaign, in which they helped capture Ctesiphon in 198.

Crisis of the 3rd Century and Dominate 
In 260–268 the Legion supported Gallienus in his war against Postumus of the Gallic Empire, being awarded the title Pia Fidelis for the 5th and 6th times, although unlike other units it never received a 7th recognition. In 273 the Legion participated in road construction in modern Jordan, and in 295 a detachment was present in Egypt. In 298 a detachment of XI Claudia was stationed in Mauretania.Two Christians within the legion named Julius and Hesychius were persecuted by Diocletian in 302, at Durostorum. Aurelius Sudecentius, a soldier of Legio XI Claudia's western detachment, died in Mauretania and was commemorated by a tombstone in Aquileia dating to the 4th century AD. In 395–425, the Legion remained headquartered on the Danube at Durostorum, with field army detachments under the Magister Militum per Gallias and under the Magister Militum Praesentalis II.

Known members of the legion

See also
 Capidava
 List of Roman legions

References

11 Claudia
50s BC establishments
58 BC
Moesia
Romanization of Southeastern Europe
History of Silistra
Military units and formations established in the 1st century BC
Military units and factions of the Bar Kokhba revolt
1st-century BC establishments in the Roman Republic